Lotus Flower is an album led by trumpeter Woody Shaw which was recorded in 1982 and released on the Enja label.

Reception

Scott Yanow of AllMusic stated, "This CD features one of trumpeter Woody Shaw's finest groups... Virtually every Woody Shaw recording is well worth acquiring, including this one."

Track listing 
All compositions by Woody Shaw except as indicated
 "Eastern Joy Dance" (Mulgrew Miller) – 9:41
 "Game" (Stafford James) – 6:42
 "Lotus Flower" (Steve Turre) – 6:58
 "Rahsaan's Run" – 8:00
 "Song of Songs" – 11:21

Personnel 
Woody Shaw – trumpet, flugelhorn
Steve Turre – trombone
Mulgrew Miller – piano 
Stafford James – bass
Tony Reedus – drums

References 

Woody Shaw albums
1982 albums
Enja Records albums